The Grande Prémio Internacional de Ciclismo MR Cortez-Mitsubishi was a professional cycling race held annually in Portugal from 1998 to 2004.

Winners

References

Cycle races in Portugal
Defunct cycling races in Portugal
Recurring sporting events established in 1998
Recurring sporting events disestablished in 2004
1998 establishments in Portugal
2004 disestablishments in Portugal
Spring (season) events in Portugal